Stimulator of interferon genes (STING), also known as transmembrane protein 173 (TMEM173) and MPYS/MITA/ERIS is a protein that in humans is encoded by the STING1 gene.

STING plays an important role in innate immunity. STING induces type I interferon production when cells are infected with intracellular pathogens, such as viruses, mycobacteria and intracellular parasites. Type I interferon, mediated by STING, protects infected cells and nearby cells from local infection by binding to the same cell that secretes it (autocrine signaling) and nearby cells (paracrine signaling.) It thus plays an important role, for instance, in controlling norovirus infection.

STING works as both a direct cytosolic DNA sensor (CDS) and an adaptor protein in Type I interferon signaling through different molecular mechanisms. It has been shown to activate downstream transcription factors STAT6 and IRF3 through TBK1, which are responsible for antiviral response and innate immune response against intracellular pathogen.

Structure 

Amino acids 1–379 of human STING include the 4 transmembrane regions (TMs) and a C-terminal domain. The C-terminal domain (CTD: amino acids 138–379) contains the dimerization domain (DD) and the carboxy-terminal tail (CTT: amino acids 340–379).

The STING forms a symmetrical dimer in the cell. STING dimer resembles a butterfly, with a deep cleft between the two protomers. The hydrophobic residues from each STING protomer form hydrophobic interactions between each other at the interface.

Expression 

STING is expressed in hematopoietic cells in peripheral lymphoid tissues, including T lymphocytes, NK cells, myeloid cells and monocytes. It has also been shown that STING is highly expressed in lung, ovary, heart, smooth muscle, retina, bone marrow and vagina.

Localization 

The subcellular localization of STING has been elucidated as an endoplasmic reticulum protein. Also, it is likely that STING associates in close proximity with mitochondria associated ER membrane (MAM)-the interface between the mitochondrion and the ER. During intracellular infection, STING is able to relocalize from endoplasmic reticulum to perinuclear vesicles potentially involved in exocyst mediated transport. STING has also been shown to colocalize with autophagy proteins, microtubule-associated protein 1 light chain 3 (LC3) and autophagy-related protein 9A, after double-stranded DNA stimulation, suggesting its presence in the autophagosome.

Function 

STING mediates the type I interferon production in response to intracellular DNA and a variety of intracellular pathogens, including viruses, intracellular bacteria and intracellular parasites. Upon infection, STING from infected cells can sense the presence of nucleic acids from intracellular pathogens, and then induce interferon β and more than 10 forms of interferon α production. Type I interferon produced by infected cells can find and bind to Interferon-alpha/beta receptor of nearby cells to protect cells from local infection.

Antiviral immunity 

STING elicits powerful type I interferon immunity against viral infection. After viral entry, viral nucleic acids are present in the cytosol of infected cells. Several DNA sensors, such as DAI, RNA polymerase III, IFI16, DDX41 and cGAS, can detect foreign nucleic acids. After recognizing viral DNA, DNA sensors initiate the downstream signaling pathways by activating STING-mediated interferon response.

Adenovirus, herpes simplex virus, HSV-1 and HSV-2, as well as the negative-stranded RNA virus, vesicular stomatitis virus (VSV), have been shown to be able to activate a STING-dependent innate immune response.

STING deficiency in mice led to lethal susceptibility to HSV-1 infection due to the lack of a successful type I interferon response.

Point mutation of serine-358 dampens STING-IFN activation in bats and is suggested to give bats their ability to serve as reservoir hosts.

Against intracellular bacteria 

Intracellular bacteria, Listeria monocytogenes, have been shown to stimulate host immune response through STING. STING may play an important role in the production of MCP-1 and CCL7 chemokines. STING deficient monocytes are intrinsically defective in migration to the liver during Listeria monocytogenes infection. In this way, STING protects host from Listeria monocytogenes infection by regulating monocyte migration. The activation of STING is likely to be mediated by cyclic di-AMP secreted by intracellular bacteria.

Other 

STING may be an important molecule for protective immunity against infectious organisms. For example, animals that cannot express STING are more susceptible to infection from VSV, HSV-1 and Listeria monocytogenes, suggesting its potential correlation to human infectious diseases.

Role in host immunity 

Although type I IFN is absolutely critical for resistance to viruses, there is growing literature about the negative role of type I interferon in host immunity mediated by STING. AT-rich stem-loop DNA motif in the Plasmodium falciparum and Plasmodium berghei genome and extracellular DNA from Mycobacterium tuberculosis have been shown to activate type I interferon through STING. Perforation of the phagosome membrane mediated by ESX1 secretion system allows extracellular mycobacterial DNA to access host cytosolic DNA sensors, thus inducing the production of type I interferon in macrophages. High type I interferon signature leads to the M. tuberculosis pathogenesis and prolonged infection. STING-TBK1-IRF mediated type I interferon response is central to the pathogenesis of experimental cerebral malaria in laboratory animals infected with Plasmodium berghei. Laboratory mice deficient in type I interferon response are resistant to experimental cerebral malaria.

STING signaling mechanisms 

STING mediates type I interferon immune response by functioning as both a direct DNA sensor and a signaling adaptor protein. Upon activation, STING stimulates TBK1 activity to phosphorylate IRF3 or STAT6. Phosphorylated IRF3s and STAT6s dimerize, and then enter nucleus to stimulate expression of genes involved in host immune response, such as IFNB, CCL2, CCL20, etc.

Several reports suggested that STING is associated with the activation of selective autophagy. Mycobacterium tuberculosis has been shown to produce cytosolic DNA ligands which activate STING, resulting in ubiquitination of bacteria and the subsequent recruitment of autophagy related proteins, all of which are required for 'selective' autophagic targeting and innate defense against M. tuberculosis.

In summary, STING coordinates multiple immune responses to infection, including the induction of interferons and STAT6-dependent response and selective autophagy response.

As a cytosolic DNA sensor 

Cyclic dinucleotides-second-messenger signaling molecules produced by diverse bacterial species were detected in the cytosol of mammalian cells during intracellular pathogen infection; this leads to activation of TBK1-IRF3 and the downstream production of type I interferon.
STING has been shown to bind directly to cyclic di-GMP, and this recognition leads to the production of cytokines, such as type I interferon, that are essential for successful pathogen elimination.

As a signaling adaptor 

DDX41, a member of the DEXDc family of helicases, in myeloid dendritic cells recognizes intracellular DNA and mediates innate immune response through direct association with STING. Other DNA sensors- DAI, RNA polymerase III, IFI16, have also been shown to activate STING through direct or indirect interactions.

Cyclic GMP-AMP synthase (cGAS), which belongs to the nucleotidyltransferase family, is able to recognize cytosolic DNA contents and induce STING-dependent interferon response by producing secondary messenger cyclic guanosine monophosphate–adenosine monophosphate (cyclic GMP-AMP, or cGAMP). After cyclic GMP-AMP bound STING is activated, it enhances TBK1's activity to phosphorylate IRF3 and STAT6 for downstream type I interferon response.

It has been proposed that intracellular calcium plays an important role in the response of the STING pathway.

See also

References

Further reading 

 
 
 
 
 
 
 
 
 

Immune system
Intracellular receptors